Star Dust is an album of phonograph records by Bing Crosby released in 1940 featuring songs that are sung sentimentally, being based upon the 1927 popular song "Star Dust". This album featured his 1939 Decca recording of the song, not the 1931 recording he made for Brunswick.

Original track listing
These previously issued songs were featured on a 6-disc, 78 rpm album set, Decca Album No. 181.

Re-issue track listing
In 1950, a set of the same name but slightly different selections was released with a darker cover. These reissued songs were featured on a 4-disc, 78 rpm album set, Decca Album No. A-678.

Disc 1 (25365): "Star Dust" / "Deep Purple"
Disc 2 (25366): "I Cried for You" / "My Melancholy Baby"
Disc 3 (25367): "The One Rose" / "Moonlight and Shadows"
Disc 4 (25368): "A Blues Serenade" / "S'posin'"

The one new song to the collection was "Moonlight and Shadows", written by Leo Robin and Frederick Hollander and recorded by Bing with Victor Young and his Orchestra on March 5, 1937 (running time: 3:15).

LP track listing
The 1950 10" LP album issue Decca DL 5126 consisted entirely of  Decca A-678 on a 10" LP.  All were reissues of earlier recordings:

Side 1

Side 2

Other releases
In 1949, the same selections as Decca DL 5126 were released on a set of three 45s on Decca 9-25.

In 1957, the same set was released on two 45 rpm EP records on a set titled Decca ED 581.

References

Bing Crosby compilation albums
1940 compilation albums
Decca Records compilation albums